Bless This Mess is Lisa Mitchell's second studio album. It was released in Australia and New Zealand on 12 October 2012. A national album tour started on 18 October 2012. The album debuted at #7 on the ARIA Charts on 21 October 2012.

"Bless This Mess" was released as a single, prior to the release of the album. It peaked at number 92 on the ARIA singles chart.

Track listing

Charts

References

2012 albums
Lisa Mitchell albums